In Korean shamanism, Gasin (literally House's God) are a branch of deities believed to protect the various objects and rooms of the house, such as jangdok or the kitchen. The Gasin faith is the faith based on worshipping these deities. The worshipping of the Gasin form a central and integral part of the traditional Korean folk religion.

Joryeong faith
The faith of Joryeong is the deification of one's ancestors. The earliest mentions of the faith is in the Samguk Sagi, a Medieval Korean history book, which mentions the 'golden chest' of Kim Alji, the first member of the Gyeongju Kim clan. This bears resemblance to modern ancestor worship. In the modern Honam region in southwest Korea, Koreans keep a large pot in the house, filled with rice. This is called the Jeseok Ogari, and holds rice. The Jeseok Ogari is accompanied with Mom Ogari, which are smaller potteries. The name of the ancestor or rice is put in the Mom Ogari. In the Yeongnam region, Jeseok Ogari and Mom Ogari is called Sejon Danji and Josang Dangsegi. In festivals and birthdays, the family holds a jesa to the Jeseok Ogari and Mom Ogaris. In the jesa, the family prays for good harvests and prosperity. Curiously, the Joryeong faith seems to be based on a matriarchic entity called 'Josang Halmae', or 'Grandmother Ancestor'.

Samsin faith

Samsin is the goddess of childbirth. Her entity was believed to be bound to the Samsin Danji, a pot kept in the inner wing of the house. The pot was filled with rice, then covered in paper and sealed with a knot tied counterclockwise. However, some households perform Geongung Samsin, or the act of honoring Samsin only in the mind. The Samsin was given Jesas every festival or birthday, and also seven and thirty-seven days after delivery. When someone is pregnant or has given delivery, the room holding the Samsin Danji was sealed with ropes. The faith of Samsin is strongest in Jeju Island.

Seongju faith
Seongju is literally the 'Owner of the Castle'. As the deity of the actual house, he is one of the most common and most famous Gasin. In Jeollanamdo, the Seongjudok, or the pottery in which Seongju was considered to dwell, was filled with barley every spring and rice every autumn. However, in Jeollabukdo, the people practiced Tteunseongju, or worshipping Seongju only in thoughts. In other regions, Seongju was mostly believed to embody a piece of paper, which was attached to the central pillar. Every birthday or festival, a Jesa was done for Seongju, where housewives prayed for abundance and peace.
Seongju was worshipped with other Gasin; however, when a new family was formed, or when a family moved to another residence, Seongju was for a time the only Gasin worshipped. Seongju is generally considered to be the greatest of the Gasin. The gut dedicated to him is one of the most famous, and he is believed to guard the eldest male member of the family.

Jowang faith

Teoju and Cheolyung faith

Eopjanggun faith

Munsin faith

Cheuksin faith

Other deities
 Nulgupjisin, god of grain
 Ulgupjisin, god of fences
 Yongsin, god of wells
 Mabuwang, god of the barn
 Sosamsin, god of cowbirth

References

 
Domestic and hearth deities
Religion in South Korea